Short Subject (commonly known as Mickey Mouse in Vietnam) is a 16 mm anti-war underground animated short film. The director was Whitney Lee Savage (father of Adam Savage, of MythBusters fame); the producer and head designer was Milton Glaser. It was produced independently in 1969 and has a total running time of one minute.

Plot 
Mickey Mouse is seen walking happily until he sees a sign reading "Join the Army and See the World"; he then walks offscreen and comes back with a helmet and gun; he arrives at Vietnam during the war via a cruise ship; however, moments after, while walking in the grass, he is shot in the head by an enemy. The short ends with Mickey lying dead on the ground, his smile turning slowly into a frown.

Production 
The short was produced under the auspices of a studio named Max Cats and Whittesey Sledge Studios. According to Glaser, it was meant for the Angry Arts Festival which, according to him, was "a kind of protest event, inviting artists to produce something to represent their concerns about the war in Vietnam and a desire to end it"; Mickey Mouse was chosen due to being a symbol of innocence.

Reception 
The film received an award from the International Short Film Festival Oberhausen in 1970. According to Glaser it was positively received from the audience.

Conservation status 
The film was erroneously thought to be lost for many years. It was shown under its French title Mickey au Vietnam or Mickey Mouse au Vietnam at the Festival Côté court de Pantin in France in 1998 and 2003. In both cases, the copy came from the French distributor ISKRA. The Cinémathèque québécoise in Montreal, Canada, used its own copy in 2004.

On April 22, 2013, YouTube user abadhiggins uploaded the video. Five years later, on July 31, 2018, the full short was uploaded by another YouTube user CDCB2 on a distorted VHS print which is low-faded; this version includes the opening and closing titles, the SMPTE Universal countdown film leader, and a Telecine Compact Video Systems servants entrance Disney segment VHS slide, both of which were absent in the 2013 upload, as well the audio track, which, until then, was assumed to be completely lost. The music prominently used in the soundtrack is The Gonk by Herbert Chappell, which was popularized by George A. Romero's horror film Dawn of the Dead.

See also
 Bambi Meets Godzilla
 Bring Me the Head of Charlie Brown
 Escalation
 Rediscovered film

References

External links
 
 Buzzfeed article with video
 Disney Cartoons That Aren't Disney Cartoons
An article about the representation of war in cartoons in the U.S., mentioning the existence of Mickey Mouse in Vietnam
 

1969 films
1969 animated films
1969 short films
1960s American animated films
1960s animated short films
American parody films
Disney parodies
American satirical films
American political satire films
American black-and-white films
American animated comedy films
Anti-war films about the Vietnam War
Vietnam War films
Films set in Vietnam
Mickey Mouse short films
Opposition to United States involvement in the Vietnam War
1960s rediscovered films
Rediscovered American films
American adult animated films
1960s English-language films